This is a list of flags of New Zealand. It includes flags that either have been in use or are currently used by institutions, local authorities, or the government of New Zealand. Some flags have historical or cultural (e.g. Māori culture) significance.

National flags

Royal and viceregal

Ensigns

Associated states and territories

Regions and cities

Māori flags

Sporting flags

Other New Zealand flags

Proposed alternative flags

Notes

References

Further reading

External links

New Zealand
 
Flags